Kerry Lee Taylor (born February 20, 1989) is a former professional football wide receiver and high school coach. In college he played for Arizona State University and in high school for Hamilton High School in Chandler, Arizona.

College career 
Taylor verbal commitment to Arizona State University as part of Dirk Koetter's 2007 recruiting class bring along teammate Colin Parker from perennial power Hamilton High School in Chandler, Arizona. Online college recruitment service Scout listed him as the 4th best prospect in Arizona and the 22nd best wide receiver nationwide. When Koetter was fired before the 2007 season and Denis Erickson hired, Taylor honored his verbal commitment to ASU by signing a letter of intent.

While at ASU, Taylor sought and completed a Bachelors in Interdisciplinary Studies with a Sociology and Communications. As his collegiate career ended, Taylor addressed Erickson's staffing decisions to a television audience as, “helping out his buddies.” He further explained, "We all know this is Erickson's last stint in coaching. He is just trying to get some of his buddies one last paycheck," due to poor offensive schemes and lackluster overall performance.

Professional career
Taylor declared for the 2011 NFL Draft but was not selected by any team therefore making him an undrafted free agent. Only the Arizona Cardinals and Jacksonville Jaguars  promoted Taylor from practice squads during regular season play.

Green Bay Packers
After going undrafted in the 2011 NFL Draft, Kerry Taylor signed with the Green Bay Packers on July 28, 2011. He played in four preseason games with the team where he caught a combined seven passes for 56 yards and one touchdown. He was released on September 3, 2011.

New England Patriots
Taylor shortly thereafter signed to the practice squad of the New England Patriots on September 5. He was subsequently released on September 16.

San Francisco 49ers
On October 12, 2011, Taylor was signed to the practice squad for the San Francisco 49ers. He was released six days later on October 18.

Minnesota Vikings
Taylor was signed to the practice squad Minnesota Vikings on October 26 after receiver Stephen Burton was signed to the 53-man roster.

New England Patriots
After being waived by the Vikings, Taylor was claimed by the New England Patriots on August 27, 2012.

Arizona Cardinals
He was promoted to the active roster from the practice squad by the Arizona Cardinals on December 26, 2012.

Jacksonville Jaguars
On November 4, 2013, the Jacksonville Jaguars signed Taylor off the Cardinals practice squad. He scored his first NFL touchdown on December 29 in a game against the Indianapolis Colts on a 14-yard pass from quarterback Chad Henne.

He was released on August 30, 2014 and signed to the team's practice squad the next day. He was promoted to the active roster on September 20. He was released on September 23 and re-signed to the practice squad the next day. He was waived from the practice squad on October 7.

Dallas Cowboys
On October 9, 2014, the Dallas Cowboys signed Taylor to their practice squad. He was released on November 30 to make room for WR Chris Boyd.

Denver Broncos
On January 15, 2015, the Denver Broncos signed Taylor to a reserve/future contract for the 2015 season. He was waived on April 23, 2015.

Coaching

Chandler High School 
Directly following his retiring from the NFL, Taylor joined the football coaching staff at Chandler High School in Chandler, Arizona for only the 2015 season where his brother Kolby Taylor was a junior wide receiver.

Salt River High School 
Taylor's first high school head coaching position was at Salt River High School in Scottsdale, Arizona, a member school of the Canyon Athletic Association (CAA) which is a sister organization to the Arizona Interscholastic Association (AIA). He would dually work at Phoenix College as passing game coordinator.

Arcadia High School 
In 2018, Taylor first head coaching of an AIA member school was at Arcadia High School in Phoenix, Arizona, in the 4A conference. The team, which was on a 16-game losing streak was guided to a 5-game winning streak to start the season and finishing with a 6-4 season. After a controversial two week termination, Taylor returned to Arcadia for another 6-4 season then resigning with a 12-8 record overall.

San Tan Charter School 
Announced in April 2020, Taylor returned as a high school head coaching taking the back-to-back CAA Charter League champions, San Tan Charter School in Gilbert, Arizona, into the more competitive AIA 2A conference. With the COVID-19 pandemic restrictions, he was unable to meet the team until on-campus workouts starting June 1. He was fired in October of 2021. In his final game of the season, he led San Tan Charter to a 40-22 win over Arete Prep. At the end of the contest, Taylor had his players stomp out a painted breast cancer ribbon at the 50-yard-line of Arete Prep's field. The ribbon was painted on the field to honor the wife of Arete Prep coach Cord Smith, who was suffering from Stage 4 breast cancer.  San Tan Charter mentioned the post-game altercation as one of the reasons for Taylor's firing.

References

External links
Arizona State Sun Devils bio

1989 births
Living people
American football wide receivers
Arizona State Sun Devils football players
New England Patriots players
San Francisco 49ers players
Minnesota Vikings players
Arizona Cardinals players
Jacksonville Jaguars players
Green Bay Packers players